María Vanina García Sokol (born 27 December 1983) is a retired professional tennis player from Argentina.

Biography
García Sokol, who comes from the Misiones Province of Argentina, turned professional at 17 years of age.

In 2003 she was a member of Argentina's Fed Cup squad and represented Argentina at the Pan American Games held in Santo Domingo.

Competing mostly on the ITF circuit, she had a best ranking of 191 in the world and won a total of three ITF singles titles. She twice qualified for the main draw of a WTA Tour tournament, the Vancouver Open in 2004 and the 2005 Copa Colsanitas Seguros Bolivar in Bogota. In 2007, she retired from professional tennis.

Based in Buenos Aires, she now works as a tennis coach and has started her own foundation.

ITF Circuit finals

Singles: 10 (3–7)

Doubles: 4 (3–1)

References

External links
 
 

1983 births
Living people
Argentine female tennis players
Sportspeople from Misiones Province
Tennis players at the 2003 Pan American Games
Pan American Games competitors for Argentina
21st-century Argentine women